Denis Klinar (born 21 February 1992) is a Slovenian footballer who plays as a defender for Fužinar.

Honours

Club
Olimpija Ljubljana
Slovenian First League: 2015–16

Maribor
Slovenian First League: 2018–19

References

External links
NZS profile 

1992 births
Living people
Slovenian footballers
Slovenia youth international footballers
Slovenia under-21 international footballers
Association football fullbacks
NK Šmartno 1928 players
NK Rudar Velenje players
NK Olimpija Ljubljana (2005) players
Puskás Akadémia FC players
NK Maribor players
Cultural Leonesa footballers
ND Gorica players
NK Fužinar players
Slovenian PrvaLiga players
Slovenian Second League players
Nemzeti Bajnokság I players
Primera Federación players
Slovenian expatriate footballers
Slovenian expatriate sportspeople in Hungary
Expatriate footballers in Hungary
Slovenian expatriate sportspeople in Spain
Expatriate footballers in Spain